NEAB (Northern Examinations and Assessment Board) was an examination board serving England, Wales and Northern Ireland from 1992 until 2000 when it merged with AEB/SEG to form AQA.

History

NEAB was formed in 1992 by the merger five of examination boards:
 The Joint Matriculation Board
 The Associated Lancashire Schools Examining Board
 The Northern Regional Examinations Board
 The North West Regional Examinations Board
 The Yorkshire and Humberside Regional Examinations Board (which itself was formed by the merger of The West Yorkshire and Lindsey Regional Examining Board and Yorkshire Regional Examinations Board in 1982)

Previously, these exam boards had been in a consortium together, the Northern Examining Association, to provide GCSEs, while the Joint Matriculation Board also offered A Levels independently. Merging allowed a single body to take on all these roles. The chief executive of NEAB for the majority of its existence was Kathleen Tattersall, who had previously led the Joint Matriculation Board.

Schools in England, Wales and Northern Ireland were able to choose any of the examination boards for award their qualifications and NEAB established itself as the biggest board in the UK.

In 1997, NEAB entered into an alliance with AEB/SEG and City & Guilds known as the Assessment and Qualifications Alliance (AQA). The 1998 examination certificates featured just the AQA name. By 1999, examination papers were dual-branded with both the AQA and NEAB names. In 2000, NEAB and AEB/SEG (but not City & Guilds) formally merged under the name AQA. As NEAB and AEB/SEG overlapped in the qualifications they offered, AQA retained two specifications for many subjects and do until this day, with schools able to choose between the two.

References

Examination boards in the United Kingdom
Organizations established in 1992
Organizations disestablished in 2000